Lieutenant General Sahibzada Muhammad Sadiq ur-Rashid Ibrahim Abbasi  (1928–2002) also known as S.M. Abbasi was a three star general in the Pakistani Army, Governor of Sindh (military administration) and member of the Bahawalpur royal family.

Early life and education
He was born in Bahawalpur into the Bahawalpur royal family and received his early education from Aitchison College at Lahore.

Military career
He joined the Royal Pakistan Army. He was commissioned in the 1 Mountain Regiment of the Royal Pakistan Artillery on 25 November 1948 as a 2nd Lieutenant. During this time, he received his military education from the Royal Indian Military Academy in Dehra Dun, India, Pakistan Military Academy in Kakul, Royal Pakistan Artillery School in Nowshera, Khyber Pakhtunkhwa and the Royal Artillery School in Larkhill, Wilts.

He remained Major General Artillery (now called DG Arty) and was promoted to rank of Lieutenant-General in 1978. He became commander of V Corps in Karachi from 1978 to 1980. During this time, he also served as martial law administrator Zone D (Baluchistan) in General Zia ul Haq.

Military Governor
He served as Governor of Sindh (military administration) starting 18 September 1978. The same year on his orders, a protest in Nawabshah (see: Human rights abuses in Pakistan under Muhammad Zia-ul-Haq) was crushed using military combat helicopters which resulted in hundreds of deaths of supporters of Zulfikar Ali Bhutto.

On 8 June 1982, he laid the foundation stones of the Al-Markaz Islami Centre with a goal of promoting Islamic traditions and culture in Sindh.

After the execution of Zulfikar Ali Bhutto on 4 April 1979, Muhammad Zia-ul-Haq flew to Karachi to discuss the burial arrangements of Bhutto with Abbasi who was then Governor of Sindh.

Personal life
He married Begum Yasmin Sultana daughter of Mir Maqbul Mahmud, in Lahore on 27 February 1960.

Death
He died from heart failure at the Combined Military Hospital Rawalpindi on 21 March 2002. He is buried at Nawabi Cemetery, Fort Derawar. He had one son and two daughters.

References 

1928 births
2002 deaths
Pakistani generals
Governors of Sindh
Aitchison College alumni
People from Bahawalpur
Bahawalpur royal family
Government Gordon College alumni
Pakistan Military Academy alumni
Pakistani military personnel of the Indo-Pakistani War of 1971
Recipients of Hilal-i-Imtiaz
Pakistan Army Artillery Corps officers